The 1970 Wyoming gubernatorial election took place on November 3, 1970. Incumbent Republican Governor Stanley Hathaway ran for re-election to a second term. He faced Democratic nominee John J. Rooney, a State Representative and the former Chairman of the Wyoming Democratic Party. Despite Democratic Senator Gale W. McGee's strong performance in the U.S. Senate race, Hathaway's popularity proved an insurmountable obstacle for Rooney to overcome, and the Governor won a second term in a landslide.

Democratic primary

Candidates
 John J. Rooney, State Representative, former Chairman of the Wyoming Democratic Party

Results

Republican Primary

Candidates
 Stanley Hathaway, incumbent Governor

Results

Results

References

1970 Wyoming elections
1970
Wyoming
November 1970 events in the United States